The Falcon Stakes (Japanese ファルコンステークス) is a Grade 3 horse race for three-year-old Thoroughbreds run in March over a distance of 1400 metres at Chukyo Racecourse.

The race was first run in 1987 and has held Grade 3 status from its inauguration. It was initially run over 1800 before being cut to 1200 metres in 1996 and then extended to 1400 metres in 2012.

Winners since 2000  

 The 2001 winner Rusunai Christie and the 2004 winner Kyowa Happiness were fillies
 The 2011 race was held at Hanshin Racecourse

Earlier winners

 1987 - Hide Ryu O
 1988 - Soccer Boy
 1989 - Osaichi George
 1990 - Long Arch
 1991 - Kogane Power
 1992 - Kyoei Bowgun
 1993 - Nehai Caesar
 1994 - Inazao Takao
 1995 - Ibuki Rajo Mon
 1996 - Sugino Hayakaze
 1997 - Opening Theme
 1998 - Tokio Perfect
 1999 - Saikyo Sunday

See also
 Horse racing in Japan
 List of Japanese flat horse races

References

Turf races in Japan